Ruan Renato Bonifácio Augusto (born 14 January 1994), known as Ruan Renato, is a Brazilian football player who plays as a defender for Gabala.

Club career
Renato made his Campeonato Gaúcho debut for Juventude on 3 February 2016 in a game against Lajeadense.

On 5 August 2021, Renato signed for Azerbaijan Premier League club Gabala.

Career statistics

Club

References

External links
 

1994 births
Sportspeople from Campinas
Living people
Brazilian footballers
Guaratinguetá Futebol players
Esporte Clube Juventude players
FK Austria Wien players
Esporte Clube Vitória players
Figueirense FC players
Botafogo de Futebol e Regatas players
Associação Atlética Ponte Preta players
Gabala FC players
Austrian Football Bundesliga players
Brazilian expatriate footballers
Expatriate footballers in Austria
Association football defenders